University of Tartu Natural History Museum is a natural history museum in Tartu, Estonia. The museum is affiliated with Tartu University.

The museum was established in 1802.

The museum has zoological, geological, botanical and mycological collections. The permanent exhibition of the museum is titled as "Earth. Life. Story."

References

External links

 

Museums in Tartu
Natural history museums